The 1998 NHK Trophy was the final event of six in the 1998–99 ISU Grand Prix of Figure Skating. It was held at the Makomanai Ice Arena in Sapporo on December 2–6. Medals were awarded in the disciplines of men's singles, ladies' singles, pair skating, and ice dancing. Skaters earned points toward qualifying for the 1998–99 Grand Prix Final.

Results

Men

Ladies

Pairs

Ice dancing

External links
 1998 NHK Trophy

Nhk Trophy, 1998
NHK Trophy